Lotfi Dziri (January 6, 1946 in Carthage – May 5, 2013) was a Tunisian actor.

Filmography
2011 : Black Gold by Jean-Jacques Annaud
2010 : City of Shadows (La Cité) by Kim Nguyen
2010 : The String (Le Fil) by Mehdi Ben Attia
2004 : Deadlines

References

External links

1964 births
2013 deaths
Tunisian male film actors
People from Carthage
21st-century Tunisian male actors